Katik Lahijan (also Romanized as Katīk Lāhījān and Katīk-e Lāhījān; also known as Katak) is a village in Luleman Rural District, Kuchesfahan District, Rasht County, Gilan Province, Iran. At the 2006 census, its population was 807, in 234 families.

References 

Populated places in Rasht County